Myra Tania De Groot (4 July 1937 – 4 April 1988) was a British-born theatre and television actress, and agent. She performed in the United Kingdom, United States, New Zealand and Australia.

Professional career
De Groot was born in Westminster, London, England, and performed as a child, from everything from a magician's assistant to a dancer, eventually appearing in West End comedy. Arriving in America from Britain in 1958 she appeared in roles for most of the 1960s there, appearing on TV series including Bewitched, The Monkees, Perry Mason, and Here Come the Brides. She performed at the noted New York cabaret "Upstairs at The Downstairs" in Ben Bagleys last review (Seven Come Eleven) in 1962 with Hal Buckley, Nancy Preiser and Cy Young. She left America and then resided in New Zealand between 1972–1980, where she appeared in many theatre roles and the 1978 film Angel Mine. She also directed stage plays. Her latter career was based in Australia, after having emigrated there in 1980, with roles in serials The Sullivans, two roles in Prisoner, a few telemovies and the film Norman Loves Rose. Her final role was in Neighbours as Eileen Clarke - a role in which De Groot appeared onscreen in the UK for fifteen months after she had died due to the fact the show aired significantly far behind the Australian airdate.

FilmographyFILMTELEVISION'''

|-
| Bewitched (TV series) || 1967 || Receptionist/Hazel Carter (episodes: How to Fall in Business with All Kinds of Help), (My What Big Ears You Have) 
|-
| The Monkees || 1968 || Mary Friar (episode: Monkees Mind There Manor)
|-
| Here Comes the Brides  (TV series) || 1969 || Maude
|-
| Buck House (TV series) || 1974/1975 || Mrs. Pratt
|-
|  The Sullivans (TV series) || 1976 || Laura Watkins
|-
| Angel Mine || 1978 || Nun
|-
| Air Hawk (TV movie) || 1981 || Aunt Ellie
|-
| Norman Loves Rose || 1982 || Mother
|-
| Zero Hero (TV movie) || 1983 || Mother 210
|-
| Special Squad (TV series) || 1984 || Grace Kiddell
|-
| Prisoner || 1980-1984 || Sheila Hawkins/Barbara Krantz
|-
| Carson's Law (TV series) ||  1984 || Mrs. Cameron
|-
| Palace of Dreams (TV miniseries) ||1985 || Sima
|-
| The Far Country (TV miniseries) || 1987 || District Nurse
|-
| In Between (TV miniseries) || 1987 || Part Three
|-
| Neighbours (TV series)  || 1985-1988 || Eileen Clarke (167 episodes)
|-
|}

Theatre
De Groot acted in the United Kingdom, New Zealand and Australia in a variety of roles on stage:Frome Here and There - Royal Court Theatre, London (1955)Mister Venus - Prince of Wales Theatre, London (1958) - as "Married woman"Ulysses in Nighttown - Arts Theatre, London (May 1959) - as KittyPieces of Eight  - Apollo Theatre, London (September 1959)Seven Come Eleven - Upstairs at The Downstairs, New York (August 1962)Riverwind - Westport Country Playhouse, Wesport, CT (July 1966)Mame - Honolulu Concert Hall, HI (June 1968) - as Agnes GoochMame - San Bernardino, CA (November 1970) - as Agnes GoochThere's a Leek in your Hat - Mercury Theatre, Auckland (October 1972)Tarantara! taranatara! - Mercury Theatre, Auckland (February 1976)Viva Mexico - North Shore Operatic Society, Auckland (March 1977)Noel & Cole - The Blue Cockatoo, Sydney (1982)Torch Song Trilogy - Her Majesty's Theatre, Sydney (1984) - as Mrs Beckoff
Spookhouse - Playbox Theatre, Melbourne (1987)Nunsense'' - Comedy Theatre, Melbourne (1987) - as Sister Hubert

Personal life

Three times married, De Groot died from cancer, aged 50 on 4 April 1988.  She is survived by five children and nine grandchildren.

References

External links
 
 Article about Myra De Groot
 Brief excerpts of Myra De Groot's appearances in Prisoner and Bewtitched.

1937 births
1988 deaths
English emigrants to Australia
Deaths from cancer in Victoria (Australia)
Australian soap opera actresses
20th-century Australian actresses
People from Westminster